Soulive is an album by Soulive that was released on April 8, 2003. It peaked at No. 10 on Billboard's jazz album chart.

Track listing
"Aladdin" (Neal Evans) – 5:48
"El Ron" (Alan Evans) – 5:58
"Solid" (Alan Evans) – 6:12
"First Street" (Eric Krasno) – 6:39
"Shaheed" (Neal Evans) – 7:45
"Dig" (Neal Evans) – 7:55
"One In Seven" (Alan Evans) – 9:26
"Lenny" (Stevie Ray Vaughan) – 6:38
"Turn It Out" (Soulive) – 12:43

Source:

References

2003 live albums
Soulive albums
Blue Note Records live albums